Haverford station may refer to:

Haverford station (Norristown High Speed Line)
Haverford station (SEPTA Regional Rail)